"Just One More Kiss" is the second single by the Japanese rock band Buck Tick. It was released on October 26, 1988 by Victor Entertainment as the band's major label debut.

Description
It was the second single released by Buck Tick in two years. It reached number 6 on the Oricon Chart and charted for 20 weeks. The song earned the band a nomination for Best New Artist at the 30th Japan Record Awards.

Track listing

Musicians
Atsushi Sakurai - Voice
Hisashi Imai - Electric guitar
Hidehiko Hoshino - Electric and acoustic guitar
Yutaka Higuchi - bass
Toll Yagami - Drums

References

External links
 

Songs about kissing
1988 singles
Buck-Tick songs
1988 songs
Victor Entertainment singles
Songs with lyrics by Atsushi Sakurai
Songs with music by Hisashi Imai